2013 U.S. Open may refer to:

2013 U.S. Open (golf), a major golf tournament
2013 US Open (tennis), a grand slam tennis event
2013 Lamar Hunt U.S. Open Cup, a soccer tournament for U.S. teams
2013 U.S. Open Grand Prix Gold,  badminton tournament